Intel P4 may refer to:

 Intel Pentium 4, a 7th generation Intel CPU design
 Intel 80486, a 4th generation Intel processor design
 However now there are many Intel P4 processors

πP4